Manors is a railway station on the East Coast Main Line, which runs between  and . The station serves the Quayside and Shieldfield areas of the city of Newcastle upon Tyne in Tyne and Wear, England. It is owned by Network Rail and managed by Northern Trains. The Metro station of the same name is not directly connected, and located a short walk away.

Manors was previously a much larger and more significant station, located at the junction of the East Coast Main Line and the line towards Gosforth. It had nine platforms. Most of the station was closed on 23 February 1978, when the line towards Gosforth was turned over to the Tyne and Wear Metro, and the station buildings were subsequently demolished to make way for offices – which themselves have recently been demolished.

History
The original station named Manors was opened on 1 July 1847 by the Newcastle and Berwick Railway, which amalgamated with the York and Newcastle Railway to form the York, Newcastle and Berwick Railway a few weeks later. Manors station opened on 30 August 1850 to replace a temporary station that became a coal depot, and had two platforms on a bridge over Trafalgar Street.  When the East Coast Main Line was widened to four tracks in 1887, an additional two platforms were built.

On 1 January 1909, the former Blyth and Tyne Railway terminus at  closed and the line was extended to join the East Coast Main Line between Manors and Newcastle Central. Manors North was opened on this line, with two through platforms and three bays.  The original station was renamed Manors East. The former station at New Bridge Street became a coal yard which supplied customers in the east of the city.

When the two stations were combined on 20 February 1969, Manors North formed platforms 1–5 and Manors East platforms 6–9.

From 1904 until 1967 the lines through the station were electrified as part of the Tyneside Electrics system with the third-rail (North Tyneside Loop) and a short overhead electrification from Trafalgar South yard (Newcastle Quayside branch).  The East Coast Main Line was re-electrified in 1990.  There were three signal boxes that controlled the approaches to the Manors area - Argyle Street (187? - 1964), Manors North (1909 - 1964), Manors Junction (1909 - 1964).  A major re-signalling of the Newcastle district in 1964 resulted in the closure of these boxes.  The original Manors Junction signal box was burnt out in 1943, and its replacement was at the western end of Manors East, between platforms 7 and 8.

In addition to the busy electric service to the coast, Manors was a terminus for trains to Morpeth, Blyth and Newbiggin.  Although the Morpeth service had gone by BR days, the Blyth/Newbiggin passenger route survived until 1964. In LNER days, the bay platforms were used as standage for electric sets and for short workings to Benton.

Reconstruction
Most platforms at Manors closed on 23 January 1978 to allow for the construction of the Tyne and Wear Metro. The station now has two platforms, on the site of the previous platforms 7 and 8. Other parts of the former station remain, including the heavily overgrown platforms 1 and 2 and parts of platform 9. The station is unstaffed, and the only facilities are a shelter with a telephone, a bike rack and a ticket machine (card only). The platforms are reached by a footbridge rather than by the original subway, so the station is not accessible for wheelchair or mobility-impaired users.

Refurbishment 
In early 2015, the station received a new shelter, cycle racks, seats and a timetable information board, as requested by a small group of enthusiasts.

Accidents and incidents
On 3 March 1913, an empty stock train was in a rear-end collision with an electric multiple unit, due to a signalman's error. Forty-nine people were injured.
On 7 August 1926, an electric multiple unit overran signals and was in collision with a freight train. The driver had tied the controller down and thus the train was able to continue when he leant out of the train and was killed, when he struck an overbridge.

Services

Northern Trains 

As of the June 2021 timetable change, there is an hourly service between Newcastle and Morpeth. Two trains per day (Monday to Saturday) extend to Chathill. Most trains continue to Carlisle via Hexham. All services are operated by Northern Trains.

Rolling stock used: Class 156 Super Sprinter and Class 158 Express Sprinter

Proposed services 
Services on the proposed Northumberland Line, which will run between Newcastle and Ashington, are expected to commence by the end of 2024.

In popular culture
The station briefly featured in the 1971 film Get Carter, which showed the long staircase from the Trafalgar Street entrance of the station.

References

External links
 

Railway stations in Tyne and Wear
DfT Category F2 stations
Former North Eastern Railway (UK) stations
Railway stations in Great Britain opened in 1847
Railway stations in Great Britain opened in 1909
Railway stations in Great Britain closed in 1978
Northern franchise railway stations
1847 establishments in England